"Everyone Says 'Hi' is a song recorded by English singer David Bowie for his twenty-second studio album Heathen (2002). It was written by Bowie, and produced by British duo Brian Rawling and Gary Miller, with vocals produced by the singer himself with Tony Visconti. The song was released on 16 September 2002, by ISO and Columbia Records. "Everyone Says 'Hi' peaked at number 20 on the UK Singles Chart and also reached number 83 in the German Singles Chart.

Background
Reeves Gabrels, Bowie's guitarist throughout the 1990s and close creative partner up until a few years before Heathen was released, said that "Everyone Says 'Hi was the only song Bowie made after his departure that he heard "because someone told me that David wrote that for me. That made me cry."

Four of the six B-sides to this 3 CD set are re-recordings of some of Bowie's less familiar 1960s material that were intended for their own album release back in 2000, whilst "Safe" and "Wood Jackson" were new compositions, the former originally written but dropped from the soundtrack to The Rugrats Movie.

Track listing

UK version 1
 "Everyone Says 'Hi' (Radio edit)" - 3:29
 "Safe" - 4:43
 "Wood Jackson" - 4:48

UK version 2
 "Everyone Says 'Hi' (Radio edit)" - 3:29
 "When the Boys Come Marching Home" - 4:46
 "Shadow Man" - 4:46

UK version 3
 "Everyone Says 'Hi' (Radio edit)" - 3:29
 "Baby Loves That Way" - 4:44
 "You've Got a Habit of Leaving" - 4:51

European version 1
 "Everyone Says 'Hi' (Radio edit)" - 3:29
 "Safe" - 4:43
 "Baby Loves That Way" - 4:44
 "Sunday (Tony Visconti mix)" - 4:56

European version 2
 "Everyone Says 'Hi' (Radio edit)" - 3:29
 "Safe" - 4:43

12" promo version
 "Everyone Says 'Hi' (Metro remix)"
 "Everyone Says 'Hi' (Metro remix - Radio edit)"
 "I Took a Trip on a Gemini Spaceship (Deepsky's Space Cowboy remix)"

Charts

Production credits
 Producers
 Brian Rawling
 Gary Miller
 David Bowie
 Tony Visconti
Musicians:
David Bowie: Vocals, Keyboards, Synths, Guitars, Sax, Stylophone, Drums
Tony Visconti: Bass guitar, Guitars, Recorders, B-vox, String arrangements
Matt Chamberlain: Drums, Loop programming, Percussion
David Torn: Guitars, Guitar loops, Omnichord
Jordan Rudess: Piano and Hammond organ.
Carlos Alomar: Guitar 
 Gary Miller: Programming and guitar
 Dave Clayton: Keyboards on "Everyone Says 'Hi'
The Scorchio Quartet
Greg Kitzis: 1st violin
Meg Okura: 2nd violin
Martha Mooke: Viola
Mary Wooten: Cello

Other releases
 The "Metro mix - radio edit" was released on two various artists charity albums for War Child called Peace Songs and Hope.
 The "Metro mix" was also featured in the video game Amplitude.
 The song, as covered by Fyfe Monroe, features in the closing of the final episode of the TV series Defiance.

References

2002 singles
David Bowie songs
Songs written by David Bowie
Song recordings produced by David Bowie
Song recordings produced by Tony Visconti
2002 songs